
Gmina Susiec is a rural gmina (administrative district) in Tomaszów Lubelski County, Lublin Voivodeship, in eastern Poland.

The gmina contains parts of the protected areas called Krasnobród Landscape Park and Puszcza Solska Landscape Park.

Villages
Gmina Susiec contains the villages and settlements of Ciotusza Nowa, Ciotusza Stara, Dmitroce, Grabowica, Huta Szumy, Kniazie, Koszele, Kunki, Łasochy, Łosiniec, Łuszczacz, Majdan Sopocki Drugi, Majdan Sopocki Pierwszy, Maziły, Nowiny, Oseredek, Paary, Podrusów, Rebizanty, Róża, Rybnica, Rybnica-Niwka, Sikliwce, Skwarki, Susiec, Świdy, Wólka Łosiniecka, Zagóra, Zagrodniki, Zawadki and Zuby.

Neighbouring gminas
Gmina Susiec is bordered by the gminas of Józefów, Krasnobród, Łukowa, Narol, Obsza and Tomaszów Lubelski.

References

Polish official population figures 2006

Susiec
Tomaszów Lubelski County